Leonardo González Arce (born November 21, 1980) is a Costa Rican ex professional footballer who played as a defender for Herediano.

Career

Club

González made his professional debut for Herediano on September 24, 2000 against Puntarenas and scored his first league goal on August 4, 2002 against Carmelita. González was an important player for Herediano, appearing in 154 league matches and scoring 3 goals in nine years at the club. He stayed with the team until his transfer to Municipal Liberia, also known as Liberia Mia in early 2009. On July 2, 2009, it was announced that he was signed to Seattle Sounders FC of Major League Soccer.

Upon signing González, Coach Sigi Schmid said, “It’s nice to have a naturally left-footed player. He can play left back, play center back in a pinch, and he can also play wide and run the whole line for us. He is an attacking left fullback with good size and athleticism. He’s very willing to get forward out of a defensive position and does a good job defensively.”

González stayed with Seattle through the end of the 2015 MLS season. On December 22, 2015, González signed with Herediano, his original Costa Rican club.

International
González made his debut for Costa Rica in a November 2002 friendly match against Ecuador and earned a total of 61 caps, scoring 1 goal. He represented his country in 15 FIFA World Cup qualification matches and played at the 2006 FIFA World Cup as well as the 2003, 2007 and 2009 CONCACAF Gold Cups. He was also selected to play in the UNCAF Nations Cup 2007, where he scored against Honduras.

His final international was a July 2009 CONCACAF Gold Cup match against El Salvador.

International goals

Personal life
González is married to Alejandra Abarca Hernández and they have two children.

González received his U.S. green card in March 2011. This qualifies him as a domestic player for MLS roster purposes.

Honors

Costa Rica
UNCAF Nations Cup (1): 2007

Municipal Liberia
Primera División de Costa Rica (1): Verano 2009

Club Sport Herediano
Primera División de Costa Rica (1): Verano 2016

Seattle Sounders FC
Lamar Hunt U.S. Open Cup (3): 2009, 2010, 2011, 2014
MLS Supporters' Shield: 2014

References

External links
 
 

1980 births
Living people
Footballers from San José, Costa Rica
Association football defenders
Costa Rican footballers
Costa Rica international footballers
2003 UNCAF Nations Cup players
2003 CONCACAF Gold Cup players
2004 Copa América players
2006 FIFA World Cup players
2007 UNCAF Nations Cup players
2007 CONCACAF Gold Cup players
2009 UNCAF Nations Cup players
2009 CONCACAF Gold Cup players
C.S. Herediano footballers
Municipal Liberia footballers
Seattle Sounders FC players
Costa Rican expatriate footballers
Expatriate soccer players in the United States
Major League Soccer players
Copa Centroamericana-winning players